Mihail Ivanov (born 7 August 1989) is a Bulgarian footballer who most recently played as a goalkeeper for Tsarsko Selo Sofia.

Club career
Ivanov began his career at Levski Sofia. In 2004 the friends of his parents make contact with Academy Renato Curi and on 15-years old Mihail travelled alone to Italy.

In 2006 Ivanov moved to the youth squads of Siena. He played two years for Siena in Campionato Nazionale Primavera and was named the best goalkeeper for 2008–09 season. His first involvement in the first team was after being named on the bench for Siena's game against Palermo on 10 May 2009, which finished 1–0 in favour of Siena.

On 16 August 2010, Ivanov joined Foggia on loan until the end of the 2010–11 season. He made his competitive debut on 22 August, in a 3–0 away win against Cavese 1919. Ivanov earned 16 appearances in the Lega Pro Prima Divisione and kept five clean sheets during the season.

In June 2011 he returned to Siena as fourth choice behind Željko Brkić, Gianluca Pegolo and Simone Farelli. A loan to Atletico Roma F.C. was collapsed. On 17 January 2012, Piacenza confirmed Ivanov has joined on loan until the end of the season. He made his debut two weeks later, in a 1–0 away win over Cremonese.

After his contract with Siena expired in June 2012, Ivanov joined Botev Vratsa on a free transfer on 30 August. On 15 September, he made his A PFG debut against CSKA Sofia in a 3–0 away loss.

Botev Plovdiv
On 9 July 2014, Ivanov signed a two-year contract as a free agent with Botev Plovdiv. He made his debut on 20 July and kept a clean sheet during the 1–0 win over Lokomotiv Sofia. On 23 September, he kept a clean sheet again this time during the 0–4 away win over Lokomotiv Mezdra in the first round of the Bulgarian Cup.

After a long absence from the starting lineup, on 11 May 2015, Mihail Ivanov played 90 minutes during the 0–1 loss from Litex Lovech. Five days later, on 16 May, Ivanov was again in the starting lineup during the 3–2 win over CSKA Sofia. In the next round, on 23 May, Ivanov conceded two goals during 1–2 away defeat from Beroe Stara Zagora.

International career
Ivanov was called up to the Bulgaria U-21 team, but has not appeared in any official games. He was nominated for the first time for the senior national team in May 2013, for friendly matches against Japan and Kazakhstan. He was an unused substitute over the course of the first match and earned his first cap on 4 June 2013, coming on as a replacement for Plamen Iliev during the second half of a 2:1 win.

Career statistics

References

External links
 
 
 Profile at LevskiSofia.info

Living people
1989 births
Bulgarian footballers
Bulgarian expatriate footballers
Association football goalkeepers
A.C.N. Siena 1904 players
Calcio Foggia 1920 players
Piacenza Calcio 1919 players
FC Botev Vratsa players
PFC Levski Sofia players
Botev Plovdiv players
FC Vitosha Bistritsa players
FC Tsarsko Selo Sofia players
First Professional Football League (Bulgaria) players
Expatriate footballers in Italy
Bulgarian expatriate sportspeople in Italy
Bulgarian expatriate sportspeople in Sweden